Vidar Johansen (born 2 June 1953 in Oslo, Norway) is a Norwegian jazz musician (tenor, soprano, baritone and alto saxophones, flute, bass clarinet), music arranger and composer.

Biography 
Johansen is considered one of the most talented saxophonists emerging out of the Norwegian jazz scene in the 1970s. He started out early 1970 in a quartet with Jon Eberson, and collaborated with the Balke brothers. He also collaborated within Jon Balke Quartet (1973–74), "The amateur big band" in Kongsberg (1974,) in the jazz-rock band "Adonis" (1974–75) and was recognized in his quartet led together with Erik Balke (1974–77), engaged at the Moldejazz (1975) and Vossajazz (1976).

He was also a member of the University Big Band in Oslo (1977), inter alia, "Hipshot Percussion" 1976–1978, "Shrub Smoul" 1977–78, jazz rock group "Lotus" from 1977 to 1983 with an album (1979), Espen Rud's "Kråbøl" 1978, a quartet with bassist Åsmund Snortheim (1978–79), Åge Røthe Quartet 1979–80),  "Lille Frøen Saksofonkvartett" (1979–89) joining in several festival gigs and the album 4 men (1986), Per Høglend Sextet (1980–81), Anne-Marie Giørtz Quintet (1982–87) with albums released in 1983 and 1985. In 1984 he joined the band "Out to Lunch", and they released the albums Out To Lunch (1988) and Kullboksrytter (1994), Oslo 13 1986–1992, Ole Jacob Hansen / Harald Gundhus big band from 1988 trio with Kåre Garnes and Tom Olstad (1990), Søyr from 1991 with the album release Buses homesick 1993 and The meat and love (1995), Grand Slam and Quartet Decisive from 1992, besides that he has been frequently substitute in Radio big band 1978– 90 (pl.innsp. 1987), participated in the Per Husby Dedication Orchestra from 1984 to 1988 (pl.innsp. 1985, 87) and recorded discs with ia The Gambian / Norwegian Friendship Orchestra 1982 Jens Wendelboe Big Band in 1983, Lars Martin Myhre / Slagen Big Band (1983–85), "Jazz on Norwegian" 1990 Jens Wendelboe Big Crazy Energy Band from 1991 to 1992, Knut Kristiansen Monk Moods (1995), Odd Børretzen / Lars Martin Myhre (1995), Eivind Aarset (1997), "Element" (1998) and Lars Martin Myhre (1998–99), Kjell Karlsen Big Band (2001), Ron Olsen (2002) and Paul Weeden (2003).

A versatile, skilled and quality creative musician; In recent years he has, among other things contributed as energetic soloist on bass clarinet on plates with Søyr, Ab und Zu and Bugge Wesseltoft (1995–1996). As composer known for his subtle titles, compositional documentation as on the album Nordjazz Big 5" recorded by Danish Radio Big Band in 1987 and Sony Simmons plays the music of Vidar Johansen – The traveler (2004–05).

Finally he released an album Lopsided (1997) under his own name, Vidar Johansen Trio record live at Oslo Jazzhus in 1995. Along with Bjørnar Andresen and Thomas Strønen he formed the band "Bayashi" who released the album Help Is on Its Way (2001) and Rock (2004). Later he participated in the Tine Asmundsen Lonely Woman albums Alive (2003), Demons' Diversions (2005), Radegund (2008) and Lovely Luna (2012), the album Bjørn Johansen in Memoriam (2003), Jacob Young's Evening falls (2004) and Sideways (2006), Erik Wesseltoft Con Amor (2004), Life Is A Beautiful Monster with Crimetime Orchestra (2004), Sonny Simmons The traveler (2004) and the album Madison where he collaborates with Tine Asmundsen, Richard Davis and Robert Shy (2007).

In recent years (2015) he has been living on a mountain farm in Lom, which does not prevent him from the participations on the Norwegian jazz scenes. In 2009 he released three albums, his own Lost Animals, The Core & More Vol 1 and Atomic Symphony by Crime Time Orchestra, Sonny Simmons and The Norwegian Radio Orchestra.

 Discography (in selectio) 

 Solo albums 
With Vidar Johansen Trio
1997: Lopsided (Curling Legs), Live at Oslo Jazzhus

With Vidar Johansen Quartet
2009: Lost Animals (Jazzaway Records)

 Collaborations 
With Jens Wendelboe Big Band
1983: '''Lone Attic (NOPA)

With The Gambian / Norwegian Friendship Orchestra
1983: Friendship (Odin Records)

With Anne-Marie Giørtz Band
1985: Tigers of Pain (Odin Records)

With The Per Husby Orchestra
1985: Dedications (Affinity Records)
1987: Your Eyes (NOPA)

With Egil Monn-Iversens Storband fest. Sylfest Strutle
1985: Live at Gildevangen (Camp Records)

With "Lille Frøen Saksofonkvartett»
1986: 4 menn (Odin Records)

With "Out To Lunch»
1988: Out To Lunch (Odin Records)
1995: Kullboksrytter (Curling Legs), with The Norwegian String Quartet and Sidsel Endresen

With "Element»
1996: Element (Turn Left Prod)
1999: Shaman (Blå Productions)

With "Bayashi»
2003: Help Is on Its Way (Ayler Records)
2004: Rock (Jazzaway Records)

With Tine Asmundsen Lonely Woman
2003: Alive (Hazel Jazz)
2005: Demons' Diversions (Hazel Jazz)
2008: Radegund (Hazel Jazz)
2012: Lovely Luna (Hazel Jazz)

With Jacob Young
2004: Evening falls (ECM Records)
2006: Sideways (ECM Records)

With Erik Wesseltoft Quintet
2004: Con Amor (Normann Records)

With Tine Asmundsen, Richard Davis, Robert Shy
2007: Madison (Hazel Jazz)

With The Core & More
2009: Vol 1 – The Art of No Return (Moserobie Records)

With The Crime Time Orchestra, Sonny Simmons and The Norwegian Radio Orchestra
2009: Atomic Symphony (Jazzaway Records)

With John Surman and Bergen Big Band
2014: Another Sky (Grappa Music)

Compilations
2003: Bjørn Johansen in Memoriam (Hot Club Records), with various artists
2010: Jazz From Norway 2010 JazzCD.No 4th Set (Norsk Jazz Forum), with various artists

References

External links
Vidar Johansen Biography – Norsk jazzarkiv MIC.no

Norwegian jazz saxophonists
Norwegian jazz composers
Male jazz composers
Curling Legs artists
Jazzaway Records artists
ECM Records artists
1953 births
Living people
Musicians from Oslo
People from Lom, Norway
21st-century saxophonists
21st-century Norwegian male musicians
Søyr members
Jacob Young Group members
Ab und Zu members